Farther Pomerania, Hinder Pomerania, Rear Pomerania or Eastern Pomerania, is the part of Pomerania which comprised the eastern part of the Duchy and later Province of Pomerania. It stretched roughly from the Oder River in the West to Pomerelia in the East. Since 1945, Farther Pomerania has been part of Poland; the bulk of former Farther Pomerania is within the West Pomeranian Voivodeship, while its easternmost parts are within the Pomeranian Voivodeship. The Polish term Pomorze Zachodnie ("Western Pomerania") is colloquially used in contemporary Poland as a synonym for the West Pomeranian Voivodship whose borders do not match the historical ones; in Polish historical usage, it applied to all areas west of Pomerelia (i.e. to the entire narrow Pomerania).

Farther Pomerania emerged as a subdivision of the Duchy of Pomerania in the partition of 1532, then known as Pomerania-Stettin and already including the historical regions Principality of Cammin, County of Naugard, Land of Słupsk-Sławno, and with ties to the Lauenburg and Bütow Land. After the Brandenburg-Swedish partition of Pomerania, Farther Pomerania became the Brandenburg-Prussian Province of Pomerania (1653–1815). After the reorganization of the Prussian Province of Pomerania in 1815, Farther Pomerania was administered as Regierungsbezirk Köslin (Koszalin). In 1938, northern part of the dissolved Grenzmark Posen-West Prussia was merged in.

After Germany's defeat in World War II, the region became part of Poland. The population of the area, being German-speaking by large majority, was completely expelled and replaced with Polish citizens, some of whom were expellees themselves as well.

Before 1999, the Szczecin Voivodeship (1945–1998) and its spin-offs Koszalin Voivodeship (1950–1998) and Słupsk Voivodeship (1975–1998) roughly resembled the area of former Farther Pomerania. The Szczecin and Koszalin Voivodeships were merged in 1999 and now constitute the West Pomeranian Voivodeship, while Słupsk Voivodeship was merged into the Pomeranian Voivodeship.

Origin and use of the term

Terminology 
The German prefix Hinter- (cf. hinterland) denotes a location more distant from the speaker, and is the equivalent of "Hinder"/"Rear"/"Farther" in English and Posterior/Ulterior/Trans- in Latin (with the corresponding antonyms in German, English and Latin being Vor-, "Fore"/"Front"/"Hither" and Anterior/Citerior/Cis-, respectively).

The toponym Pomerania comes from Slavic po more, which means Land at the Sea.
Initially, Farther Pomerania referred to the areas beyond (i.e. lying east of) Pomerania-Wolgast, and the name eventually became adopted for areas east of Stettin by the 16th century. When the 1648 Peace of Westphalia and the Treaty of Stettin (1653) divided the Duchy of Pomerania into its Western, Swedish and Eastern Brandenburgian parts, Farther Pomerania was used for the latter - in opposition to Swedish Hither Pomerania (Vorpommern) including Stettin (Szczecin), Wollin (Wolin) and a strip of land east of the Oder River, ultimately limited to include two suburbs of Szczecin, namely the towns of Gollnow (Goleniów) and Damm/Alt-Damm/Altdamm (Dąbie). To the East, Farther Pomerania stretches to the border with Pomerelia, considered by the Polish historiography to be located on the river Łeba. 

In the post-1945 era, Farther Pomerania was affected by the Polish-German border shift. Before, it happened to be the Eastern part of German Pomerania (Pommern, consisting of Hither and Farther Pomerania), yet thereafter it became the Western part of Polish Pomerania (Pomorze, consisting of Pomerania and Pomerelia). As Polish Pomorze has also been in use for Pomerelia, while Hither and Farther Pomerania are jointly referred to as West Pomerania (Pomorze Zachodnie) in Poland, located predominantly in today's West Pomeranian Voivodeship, including Szczecin (Stettin) and Wolin (Wollin). However, this term is not being adopted by the Germans, as only Hither Pomerania is considered to be Western Pomerania, so Farther Pomerania is still in use.

Cities and towns 

There are four cities in Farther Pomerania, namely:
Kołobrzeg (Kolberg)
Koszalin (Köslin)
Stargard (Stargard in Pommern)
Słupsk (Stolp in Pommern)

Major and/or historically meaningful towns of Farther Pomerania include:
Białogard (Belgard)
Darłowo (Rügenwalde)
Drawsko Pomorskie (Dramburg)
Gryfice (Greifenberg in Pommern)
Gryfino (Greifenhagen)
Kamień Pomorski (Cammin)
Karlino (Körlin an der Persante)
Łobez (Labes)
Miastko (Rummelsburg)
Nowogard (Naugard)
Połczyn-Zdrój (Bad Polzin)
Pyrzyce (Pyritz)
Resko (Regenwalde)
Szczecinek (Neustettin)
Sławno (Schlawe)
Świdwin (Schivelbein)
Trzebiatów (Treptow)
Ustka (Stolpmünde)
Złocieniec (Falkenburg)

In addition, the following towns are located in the historical Lauenburg and Bütow Land, thus being treated as part of Pomerelia by the Polish historiography, and as part of Farther Pomerania by the German historiography:
Bytów (Bütow)
Lębork (Lauenburg in Pommern)
Łeba (Leba)

Historical languages and dialects 
 primarily German, Ostpommersch variant of Low German
 in easternmost rural areas Kashubian
 Slovincian dialect in the rural areas of Leba (Łeba) and Lauenburg (Lębork), roughly Germanized by 1850.

History (timeline) 

 1317 Lands of Schlawe and Stolp become part of the Duchy of Pomerania (before 1347 as a fief of the margraves of Brandenburg)
 1466 Lauenburg and Bütow Land is handed by Poland over to the Duchy of Pomerania as a trust/fief, in reward for supporting Poland in wars against the Teutonic Order State
 1532 Partition of the Duchy of Pomerania, Farther Pomerania becomes Pomerania-Stettin 
 1630 Swedish occupation following the Treaty of Stettin (1630)
 1637 Lauenburg and Bütow Land is reclaimed by Poland to become part of Royal Prussia (Pomerelia)
 1648 Brandenburg-Prussia and the Swedish Empire agree on a partition of Pomerania in the Peace of Westphalia
 1653 Treaty of Stettin (1653): Farther Pomerania becomes Brandenburg-Prussia's Province of Pomerania
 1657 Lauenburg and Bütow Land is pawned by Poland to Brandenburg-Prussia
 1771 Lauenburg and Bütow Land is annexed by the King in Prussia and is integrated into the Province of Pomerania of the Kingdom of Prussia
 1772-1773 in the course of First Partition of Poland, Lauenburg and Bütow Land is reattached to the former Royal Prussia (now renamed West Prussia)
 1777 Lauenburg and Bütow Land is ultimately disentangled from West Prussia and made part of the Province of Pomerania of the Kingdom of Prussia, but remains a part of the Roman Catholic Diocese of Chełmno
 1815 Farther Pomerania administered as Regierungsbezirk Köslin within the reorganized Prussian Province of Pomerania
 1919 Treaty of Versailles - the bulk of Pomerelia, as well as minor parts of the Stolp, Lauenburg and Bütow districts are awarded to the re-established Polish state; the bulk of Farther Pomerania, Lauenburg and Bütow Land, as well as minor parts of the remainder of Pomerelian lands remain part of Germany
 1923 Lauenburg and Bütow Land, along with those of the remainder of Pomerelian lands which were made part of the new Grenzmark Posen-West Prussia, is disentangled from the (once again Polish) Roman Catholic Diocese of Chełmno and made part of the Apostolic Administration of Tütz (later transformed into the Prelature of Schneidemühl) 
 1938 northern part of the dissolved Grenzmark Posen-West Prussia merged in
 1945 Oder-Neisse line, entire Farther Pomerania placed first under Soviet, subsequently under Polish administration, since then remains as part of Poland
 1945 Apostolic Administration of Kamień, Lubusz and the Prelature of Piła is established in Gorzów Wielkopolski and takes over the responsibility for Catholics in Farther Pomerania, the region remains however formally a part of the Roman Catholic Diocese of Berlin 
 1945–1950 newly established Szczecin Voivodeship includes the entire Farther Pomerania, primarily Polish settlers replace the former German population
 1950 Koszalin Voivodeship is carved out of the eastern part of Szczecin Voivodeship
 1972 - papal bull Episcoporum Poloniae coetus following the Treaty of Warsaw - Apostolic Administration of Kamień, Lubusz and the Prelature of Piła is dissolved; Farther Pomerania is formally disentangled from the Diocese of Berlin and covered by the newly established Roman Catholic Archdiocese of Szczecin-Kamień and the Roman Catholic Diocese of Koszalin-Kołobrzeg, with minor easternmost parts integrated into the Roman Catholic Diocese of Chełmno
 1975–1998 Farther Pomerania divided between Szczecin Voivodeship, Koszalin Voivodeship, and the newly established Słupsk Voivodeship
 since 1999, the region divided between the West Pomeranian (western two thirds) and Pomeranian (eastern one third) Voivodeships.

See also 
 List of towns in Farther Pomerania
 Pomerania
 Dukes of Pomerania
 House of Pomerania
 Pomerelia

References 

Pomerania
Geography of Pomerania
Regions of Poland